Naunihal Singh may refer to:

Naunihal Singh (politician) (born 1923), member of the Indian Parliament
Naunihal Singh (academic), political scientist